Parallel-strand lumber (PSL) is a form of engineered wood made from parallel wood strands bonded together with adhesive. It is used for beams, headers, columns, and posts, among other uses. It is a member of the structural composite lumber (SCL) family of engineered wood products.

The design strength of PSL is greater than that of sawn lumber as the  strands are glued together in a directional manner and under high pressure. This results in a much denser and stronger material. Because knots and other imperfections are randomly dispersed throughout the product (and filled up and fortified with glue) strength variability from one piece of PSL to another is less than in solid-sawn wooden beams. Since wooden construction materials are commonly graded to the lowest 5th percentile of the material's strength curve, PSL has much higher usable values for bending, tension parallel to grain, and compression parallel to grain.

Parallam is the brand name for the product invented, developed, commercialized and patented by MacMillan Bloedel (now Weyerhaeuser).  It is the world's only commercially manufactured and marketed parallel-strand lumber product. PSL can be made from any wood species, but Douglas fir, southern pine, western hemlock, and yellow poplar are commonly chosen because of their superior strength.

The beams are continuously formed, so the length of the beam is limited only to the maximum length that can be handled and transported.

References 

Plywood
Engineered wood
MacMillan Bloedel
Weyerhaeuser